In political sociology, but also operative within the rest of the animal kingdom, a power structure is a hierarchy of competence or aggression (might) predicated on influence between an individual and other entities in a group. A power structure focuses on the way power and authority is related between people within groups such as a government, nation, institution, organization, or a society. Such structures are of interest to various fields, including sociology, government, economics, and business. A power structure may be formal and intentionally constructed to maximize values like fairness or efficiency, as in a hierarchical organization wherein every entity, except one, is subordinate to a single other entity. Conversely, a power structure may be an informal set of roles, such as those found in a dominance hierarchy in which members of a social group interact, often aggressively, to create a ranking system. A culture that is organised in a dominance hierarchy is a dominator culture, the opposite of an egalitarian culture of partnership. A visible, dominant group or elite that holds power or authority within a power structure is often referred to as being the Establishment. Power structures are fluid, with changes occurring constantly, either slowly or rapidly, evolving or revolutionary, peacefully or violently.

See also

 Authoritarianism, in which citizens are expected to devote absolute obedience to authority and are typically allowed little to no freedoms, as in Communist (Marxist-Leninist) states for example.
 Biopower, nation states' regulation of their subjects through a multitude of techniques for subjugating bodies and controlling populations
 Elite theory
 Online participation
 Plutocracy, an institution ruled and dominated by a small minority of the wealthiest members

References

Hierarchy
Management
Structure
Society
Organizational structure
Elite theory
Sociological terminology